The Schibe is a mountain of the Bernese Alps, located near Oberwil im Simmental in the canton of Bern.

References

External links
 Schibe on Hikr

Mountains of the Alps
Mountains of Switzerland
Mountains of the canton of Bern
Two-thousanders of Switzerland